Barnabás is a Hungarian masculine given name. It is a New Testament name which means "son of consolation" and was the name of St. Barnabas, an early Christian, one of the prominent Christian disciples in Jerusalem. People bearing the name Barnabás include:

Barnabás Berzsenyi, (1918–1993), Hungarian fencer
Barnabás Bese (born 1994), Hungarian footballer
Barnabás von Géczy (1897–1971), Hungarian violinist, composer and bandleader
Barnabás Kelemen (born 1978), Hungarian violinist
Barnabás Peák (born 1998), Hungarian cyclist
Barnabás Rácz (born 1996), Hungarian footballer
Barnabás Steinmetz (born 1975), Hungarian water polo player 
Barnabás Sztipánovics (born 1974), Hungarian footballer
Barnabás Tamás (born 1952), Hungarian politician
Barnabás Tóth (born 1994), Hungarian footballer
Barnabás Varga (born 1994), Hungarian footballer
Barnabás Vári (born 1987), Hungarian footballer

See also
Barnabus (disambiguation)

References

Hungarian masculine given names